Rinnleiret is an area on the border of the municipalities of Levanger and Verdal in Trøndelag county, Norway.  It is partially a nature reserve and it contains one of the county's largest beaches.  Also located in the area is a former Royal Norwegian Army camp that was closed in 2002 and a demolished airport.

References

Verdal
Levanger
Nature reserves in Norway